Pediatrix Medical Group, Inc., formerly MEDNAX, is an American physician-led health solutions partner founded in 1979 and headquartered in Sunrise, Florida. Pediatrix partners with hospitals, health systems and health care facilities to offer clinical services spanning the women’s and children’s continuum of care.

Through its affiliated professional corporations, Pediatrix provides services through a network of more than 3,000 physicians in all 50 states and Puerto Rico.

Operations 

Pediatrix is a national medical group comprising providers of neonatal, maternal-fetal and pediatric physician subspecialty services. Including neonatal physicians who provide services in neonatal intensive care units, and collaborate with affiliated maternal-fetal medicine, pediatric cardiology, pediatric critical care and other physician subspecialists. The Pediatrix network includes partnerships with more than 2,780+ physicians practicing in 20+ specialties in 1,190+ locations in 43 states and territories.  

Pediatrix areas of specialty include:

 Maternal-fetal medicine
 Neonatology
 Newborn hearing screen services
 Newborn hospitalist services
 Pediatric cardiology
 Pediatric developmental medicine
 Pediatric emergency medicine
 Pediatric gastroenterology
 Pediatric hospitalist services
 Pediatric intensive care
 Pediatric neurology
 Pediatric ophthalmology
 Pediatric orthopedics
 Pediatric otolaryngology
 Pediatric surgery
 Pediatric urology
 Telemedicine
 Urgent care

The company operates under the mission statement take great care of the patient, every day and in every way.™

The Pediatrix Center for Research, Education, Quality and Safety (CREQS) engages in clinical research, education, continuous quality improvement and safety initiatives. Pediatrix also maintains a clinical database of research and peer-reviewed articles published by Pediatrix physicians.

History 
1979 – Pediatrix Medical Group was founded as a single neonatology group.
1991 – Pediatrix began providing pediatric cardiology and pediatric intensive care physician services.
1994 – Pediatrix launched its newborn hearing screen program.
1995 – Pediatrix Medical Group is born after the company completed its initial public offering.
1996 – Electronic medical record system and Clinical Data Warehouse was introduced to bolster research, education and quality improvement initiatives.
1998 – Pediatrix began providing maternal-fetal medicine physician services. Formalized Center for Research and Education was launched.
2000 – Pediatrix University, a free online CME/CNE resource for the maternal-fetal-newborn community, was launched.
2001 – Continuous quality improvement program was introduced.
2009 – 100,000 Babies Campaign launched to improve the delivery of neonatal care to 100,000 babies over a three-year period. Mednax was established in 2009 as the parent company of Pediatrix Medical Group, Inc.
2014 – Mednax signs definitive agreement to acquire leading revenue cycle management company, MedData Inc.
2019 – MEDNAX celebrates 40 years of patient care.
2020 – New destinations for anesthesia and radiology solutions – North American Partners in Anesthesia (NAPA) acquires American Anesthesiology, MEDNAX completes sale of MEDNAX Radiology Services to Radiology Partners.
2021 – Mednax and Brave Care announce an agreement through which the two companies will develop new, innovative pediatric primary and urgent care clinics
2022 – MEDNAX changes its name to Pediatrix Medical Group, Inc. ----

References 

Health care companies established in 1979
Companies listed on the New York Stock Exchange
1979 establishments in Florida
Companies based in Broward County, Florida
Health care companies based in Florida
Sunrise, Florida
1995 initial public offerings
Life sciences industry
Newborn screening